(Trimethylsilyl)methyllithium is classified both as an organolithium compound and an organosilicon compound. It has the empirical formula LiCH2Si(CH3)3, often abbreviated LiCH2tms. It crystallizes as the hexagonal prismatic hexamer [LiCH2tms]6, akin to some polymorphs of methyllithium.  Many adducts have been characterized including the diethyl ether complexed cubane [Li4(μ3-CH2tms)4(Et2O)2] and [Li2(μ-CH2tms)2(tmeda)2].

Preparation
(Trimethylsilyl)methyllithium, which is commercially available as a THF solution, is usually prepared by treatment of [(trimethylsilyl)methyl chloride with butyllithium:
(CH3)3SiCH2Cl  +  BuLi  →  (CH3)3SiCH2Li  +  BuCl

Trimethylsilylmethyl magnesium chloride is often functionally equivalent to trimethylsilylmethyllithium.  It is prepared by the Grignard reaction of trimethylsilylmethyl chloride.

Use in methylenations
In one example of the Peterson olefination, (trimethylsilyl)methyllithium reacts with aldehydes and ketones to give the terminal alkene (R1 = Me, R2 & R3 = H):

Metal derivatives

Trimethylsilylmethyllithium is widely used in organotransition metal chemistry to affix trimethylsilylmethyl ligands. Such complexes are usually produced by salt metathesis involving metal chlorides. These compounds are often highly soluble in nonpolar organic solvents.  These complexes enjoy stability because trimethylsilylmethyl ligands are bulky and they resist beta-hydride elimination.  In these regards, trimethylsilylmethyl is akin to neopentyl.

Bis(trimethylsilylmethyl)magnesium is used as an alternative to (trimethylsilyl)methyllithium.

Related compounds
 bis(trimethylsilyl)methyllithium
 tris(trimethylsilyl)methyllithium

References

Organolithium compounds
Organosilicon compounds